Pilodeudorix ducarmei is a butterfly in the family Lycaenidae. It is found in the eastern part of the Democratic Republic of the Congo.

References

Butterflies described in 1998
Deudorigini
Endemic fauna of the Democratic Republic of the Congo